Hemel Storm are a British semi-professional basketball club from Hemel Hempstead, Hertfordshire. Founded in 2006, the Storm compete in NBL Division 1, the second tier of the British basketball system, and play their home games at the Everyone Active Hemel Hempstead Sports Centre. The club had been based in several locations across Hertfordshire and north London before settling into their current, long-term home in 2010.

The club has no formal links to the Hemel Hempstead Lakers, a basketball club formerly in the town which relocated to Milton Keynes in 1998.

History
Originally formed in 2006 as a feeder club for the West Hertfordshire Warriors, the club finished in third place in EBL Division Four (Midlands/South) in their inaugural season, gaining immediate promotion to Division Three (South).  Early in the following season, the parent team resigned from Division One due to financial difficulties, leaving the second team to carry on the name alone. The club continued to a fourth place finish despite the off-court upheavals.

The newly independent club moved their home venue to the Westfield Sports Centre in Watford for the 2008-09 season, the move bringing the club a new name (Watford Storm) and another third place finish.  However, problems with the Westfield venue led to the club playing in Edmonton by the end of the season, leading to another short-term move for the 2009-10 season, and a further name change to the Edmonton Storm.  Finally, the club moved one final time to Hemel Hempstead ahead of the 2010-11 season, renaming themselves the Hemel Storm and bringing basketball back to the town after a 13-year absence.

After settling into their new home, the club went from strength to strength. Over the following seasons, the Storm won the Patrons Cup in 2011, following up with a second placed finish in EBL Division Two in the 2011-12 season and successfully defending their Patrons Cup title.  This gained the club promotion to EBL Division One for the 2012-13 season.  The club's most high-profile triumph to date was to follow five years later, as the club claimed the National Cup for the first time after a 94-77 victory over Manchester Magic.

Honours
National Cup
 2018

Patrons Cup
 2011, 2012

Players

Current squad 2021/22 Season

Notable former players

Season-by-season records

Record in BBL competitions

References

External links
Official Hemel Storm website

Basketball teams in England